Amine Mounder, best known with his mononym Amine is a French-Moroccan R&B singer. He is known for his singular music style, Raï'n'B, which is a mix of R&B and Raï.

His biggest hits are "Ma vie", "J'voulais" and a duet with French singer Leslie in "Sobri (notre destin)". "Sobri" and "J'voulais" both reached the number-one spot on the French singles chart in 2006. Amine also charted in Belgium and Switzerland.

He also took part in a number of festivals, notably L'année de l'Algérie at Bercy in December 2003, and in Le Maroc en fête at the Paris Zénith.

Amine had a comeback in 2015 with hits like "Señorita" and "Tu verras".

Discography

Albums

Singles

*Did not appear in the official Belgian Ultratop 50 charts, but rather in the bubbling under Ultratip charts.

Other songs
2006:"Finiki" (written by Mouad Hamich Prod.by Dj kore & Bellek) 
2009 "Juste un oui" (Arab version)
2009 "Maat lohiche" (feat. Cheb Bilal)

Featured in

References

External links
 Official website
 EMI Music France
 Amine Author Mario Scolas on WikiMusique - GNU
 La Beurgeoisie The French website for successful "Beurs".

 

French male singers
Moroccan emigrants to France
Musicians from Casablanca
Living people
Year of birth missing (living people)